Everson Lins Ferreira (born January 8, 1987), known as just Chimba, is a Brazilian football player. He plays for SC Sagamihara.

Career
Chimba joined J3 League club SC Sagamihara in 2016.

References

External links

1987 births
Living people
Brazilian footballers
Brazilian expatriate footballers
Expatriate footballers in Japan
J3 League players
SC Sagamihara players
Association football forwards